Ìyál'ọ́jà (pronounced e-yah-lo-ja) is a Yoruba word that literally translates to "Mother of the Market". However, it has more commonly been used to refer to a prominent traditional chieftaincy title among the Yoruba people.

History
Across various Yoruba markets and the states they belong to, an Iyaloja is usually democratically chosen by her constituents (and is thereafter confirmed by the oba) or single-handedly chosen by the oba himself. In rare situations, like the case of the Iyaloja of Lagos in 2013, the deceased Iyaloja can choose her successor before her death. Historically, the Iyaloja of Lagos is referred to as "Iyaloja of Nigeria", despite the existence of other Iyalojas across various Yoruba-dominated states.

Research into the ancient culture and tradition of the Yoruba people has shown that despite the chieftaincy structure being largely patriarchal, the female titleholders Iyalode, Iyaloja and Iyalaje are three of the most important leaders in the system, figures whose opinions carried as much weight as those of the male chiefs. An equivalent male title known as Babaloja, meaning Father of the Market, is also functionally a subordinate of the Iyaloja.

List of "Iyalojas of Nigeria"

Controversies
On 1 January 2017, the News Agency of Nigeria reported that the Iyaloja of Ibadan, Chief Labake Lawal, had been impeached for financial misconduct by the "Ibadan Joint Traders Association". The supposedly removed Iyaloja later played down her removal, explaining that only the traditional monarch, the Olubadan of Ibadanland, had the authority to appoint or replace the Iyaloja. On 9 May 2017, after the appointment of Alhaja Iswat Abiola Ameringun as the new Iyaloja by the Olubadan, Chief Lawal described her removal as a show of ethnic bias and a reflection of a lack of due process as only the Olubadan-in-Council was capable of removing her. A new development ensued when most of the members of the traditional council disagreed with the decision from the Olubadan and posited that the removal of Chief Lawal did not represent the position of most of the cabinet members. Further to this, Chief Labake Lawal sued the Olubadan, Olubadan-in-Council and the newly installed Iyaloja for "violating her right to natural justice", urging the court to declare the new appointment "null, void and of no legal effect".

In July 2013, it was reported that the daughter of former governor of Lagos State, Chief Bola Ahmed Tinubu, had been selected as the new Iyaloja of Lagos and the rest of Nigeria, pending the granting of official approval by the Oba of Lagos. This immediately caused a media storm, as critics argued that she wasn't qualified in terms of age and market experience. Others contended that it was a strategy by Chief Tinubu to acquire more power for his family among Lagosians. The market leader for Lagos Mainland local government opined that her appointment was a collective one and was not politically influenced. The Secretary General for Lagos Markets explained that her ascension was lawful, and in accordance with the market association's statutes. She also stated that she met the minimum requirement needed to be an Iyaloja. It was also reported that Folashade was the choice of the late Iyaloja. Despite these apparent hindrances to her coronation, on 29 October 2013, Folashade Tinubu-Ojo was officially installed as the new Iyaloja. Those present at the ceremony included her stepmother, Oluremi Tinubu, the Oba of Lagos, and the Alake of Egbaland.

References

Yoruba royal titles
Yoruba words and phrases
Women in Nigeria
Yoruba politics
Noble titles
African traditional governments
African noble titles